Kandinsky is a deep crater on Mercury, located near the planet's north pole. It was named by the IAU in 2012 for Russian painter Wassily Kandinsky. 

Much of the floor of Kandinsky is a region of permanent shadow, which has a bright radar signature.  This is interpreted to represent a deposit of water ice.

The possible water ice was directly imaged by MESSENGER.

References

Mercury (planet)
Impact craters on Mercury